This article lists the presidents of the Parliament of Cantabria, the regional legislature of Cantabria.

Presidents

References
 

Cantabria